is a passenger railway station in the city of Moriya, Ibaraki Prefecture, Japan operated by the private railway company Kantō Railway.

Lines
Shin-Moriya station is served by the Jōsō Line operating between Toride and Shimodate.

Station layout
The station consists of one side platform serving one track in the Shimodate direction and one island platform serving two tracks (one disused) in the Toride direction. The station building is above the platforms.

Platforms

Adjacent stations

History
The station opened on 27 March 1982. From 1 September 2010, the station became unstaffed during the daytime.

Passenger statistics
In fiscal 2017, the station was used by an average of 2564 passengers daily.

Surrounding area
Shin-Moriya Cultural Center
National Route 294

See also
 List of railway stations in Japan

References

External links

 Kantō Railway station information 

Railway stations in Ibaraki Prefecture
Railway stations in Japan opened in 1982
Moriya, Ibaraki